Kale, also known as Kale Colony, is a village and gram panchayat in India, situated in Mawal taluka of Pune district in the state of Maharashtra.

Administration
The village is administrated by a sarpanch, an elected representative who leads a gram panchayat. At the time of the 2011 Census of India, the village was a self-contained gram panchayat, meaning that there were no other constituent villages governed by the body.

Demographics
At the 2011 census, the village comprised 514 households. The population was 2,653 (1,339 males and 1,314 females).

Air travel connectivity
The closest airport is Pune Airport.

See also
 List of villages in Mawal taluka

References

Villages in Mawal taluka
Gram Panchayats in Pune district